The 2020–21 Hyderabad FC season was club's second competitive season since its inception in 2019. The season covered the period from 1 June 2020 to 31 May 2021.

The Hyderabad finished fifth in the Indian Super League following the draw against the Goa in their last league stage match and hence missing out narrowly on the ISL playoffs.

Background 

In the view of ongoing COVID-19 pandemic, the entire season of Indian Super League was decided to be played in the empty stadiums in Goa. The tournament was scheduled to be played at three venues, Nehru Stadium in Fatorda, Tilak Maidan Stadium in Vasco da Gama and G.M.C Stadium in Bambolim.

On 29 August, Albert Roca parted ways with the Hyderabad to join the F.C. Barcelona as fitness coach under Ronald Koeman. On 31 August, Manolo Márquez took charge as new head coach of the Hyderabad.

Kits

Management team

Players

New contracts

Transfers

In

Out

Loan in

Loan out

Pre-season

Competitions

Indian Super League

League table

Results by matchday

Matches

Player statistics

Appearances and goals

Top scorers

Top assists

Clean sheets

Discipline

Summary

Awards

Players

References

Hyderabad FC seasons
Hyderabad FC